Miss Hong Kong Pageant 2015 held in TVB City on 30 August 2015. Twelve delegates competed for the title.

Results

Placements

Special Awards
Miss Photogenic: No. 1 – Louisa Mak 麥明詩
Miss Friendship: No. 5 – Iris Lam 林凱恩

Delegates
The Miss Hong Kong 2015 delegates were:

Elimination chart

Judges
Main Judging Panel:

 
Miss Photogenic judging panel: 
Wayne Lai 
Simon Yam 
William So 
Edmond Leung

Post-Pageant Notes
 Louisa Mak unplaced in Miss Chinese International Pageant 2016 in Hong Kong.

References

http://pageantsnews.com/louisa-mak-is-miss-hong-kong-2015/

Miss Hong Kong Pageants
2015 in Hong Kong
Hong Kong